The 1947 Gisborne earthquakes and tsunami occurred east of Gisborne and offshore from New Zealand's North Island. Both the two earthquakes are estimated to have measured at most 7.1 on the moment magnitude scale.

The first earthquake, which struck offshore Poverty Bay on 26 March 1947 at 8:32am NZST, seemed like a minor earthquake in Gisborne, but was 7.0–7.1 . It generated a tsunami with a maximum measured run-up height of 10 metres that struck the coast from Māhia Peninsula to Tokomaru Bay, swamping the coast between Muriwai and Tolaga Bay 30 minutes after the quake. The tsunami was not observed outside of New Zealand. Four people at the Tatapouri Hotel, 13 kilometres by road north of Gisborne, saw the tsunami coming and rushed up a hill. Two waves swept through the ground floor of the hotel up to window sill height, and retreating water then washed small buildings out to sea. A little further north at Turihaua, a 10-metre high wave hit a cottage, sweeping two men who were outside it inland onto the coast road. Three other people were trapped in the kitchen, which filled with water to head height. Retreating water then destroyed the cottage, leaving only the kitchen. The Pouawa River bridge, a little further north, was swept 800 metres inland. Seaweed was later found in telegraph wires 12 metres above sea level at Pouawa Beach. A house at Mahanga Beach, just north of Māhia Peninsula, was moved off its piles.

Seven weeks later, a second earthquake struck offshore Tolaga Bay on 17 May, and was estimated to have been 6.9–7.1 . It also generated a tsunami, which had a maximum measured run-up height of 6 metres. Despite occurring at low tide and being less powerful than the first, the tsunami caused small amounts of damage along the east coast and is noted for washing away construction materials being used to repair damage from the earlier tsunami. No one died in either of the tsunamis, but there could have been a high toll had they struck when beaches were crowded during summer holidays.

Tectonic setting
New Zealand lies along the boundary between the Indo-Australian and Pacific Plates. In the North Island the displacement is mainly taken up along the Hikurangi Subduction Zone, although the remaining dextral strike-slip component of the relative plate motion is accommodated by the North Island Fault System. Both earthquakes are believed to have occurred along the Hikurangi Subduction Zone, in close proximity to each other. Both earthquakes generated tsunami caused by the sudden release of energy from the Earth's crust. Due to the unusually large tsunami that accompanied the earthquake, and the lack of damage due to weak shaking, this event has been identified as a rare "tsunami earthquake".

See also
 List of earthquakes in 1947
 List of earthquakes in New Zealand

References

External links
 (25 March 1947)
 (17 May 1947)

Gisborne
Gisborne earthquakes
Earthquakes in New Zealand
History of the Gisborne District
Tsunamis in New Zealand
1947 tsunamis
Tsunami earthquakes
March 1947 events in New Zealand
May 1947 events in New Zealand